Atractocerops is a genus of flies in the family Tachinidae.

Species
A. aldrichi Mesnil, 1952
A. ceylanica Townsend, 1916
A. parvus (Aldrich, 1928)
A. sumatrensis (Townsend, 1927)

References

Diptera of Asia
Exoristinae
Tachinidae genera
Taxa named by Charles Henry Tyler Townsend